Chwa II Kabalega (18 June 1853 – 6 April 1923), was the King or Omukama of Bunyoro in Uganda from 1870 to 1899.

Biography 
In 1869, Kamurasi died, and two of the legitimate royal candidates, Kabalega and Kabigure, could not agree on who should be his successor. This led to a devastating war of succession in the Empire of Kitara. Normally, such wars to determine a legitimate successor were supposed to be brief and decisive until only one claimant to the throne was left alive, but sometimes these conflicts dragged on for years, destabilised all of society and led to famines, massacres and refugee crises. In this case, the clan leaders and the dead king's brother Prince Nyaika were so tired of Kabalega and Kabigure's constant fighting that they ordered Kabalega, who had the upper hand, to respect Bunyoro's laws of succession and just-war conventions, and end the war.

When Kabalega was crowned king, he set out to develop his new empire via trade and especially the Kibiro Saltworks.

He defeated the British and the Ottomans who sought to colonise his empire. On 1 January 1894, the British declared war on Bunyoro. At the height of the British offensive on his empire, Kabalega went into hiding in Acholi under the protection of Chief Awich Abok of Payira. It's from there that he consistently led his rebellion dubbed Nyangire that proved a thorn on the colonial skin.

Legacy

In 1972, President Idi Amin renamed Murchison Falls, located within Murchison Falls National Park, Kabalega Falls after the Omukama.

On 8 June 2009, Kabalega was declared a national hero of Uganda by President Museveni.

In 2010, the Most Honourable Order of Omukama Chwa II Kabalega was founded in honour of Kabalega by the Omukama of Bunyoro-Kitara

References

Bibliography

Further reading 
 A. R Dunbar, Omukama Chwa II Kabarega, East African Literature Bureau, 1965.

Ugandan monarchies
1853 births
1923 deaths